Euclidia vittata is a moth of the family Erebidae found in Chile.

References

Moths described in 1860
Euclidia
Endemic fauna of Chile